4nologue Co., Ltd. (branded as 4NOLOGUE) is a Thai media company based in Bangkok. The company was founded in 2007 by Anuwat Wichiennarat, who serves as its CEO. The company began operations as an event organizer, but since 2018 has branched into talent management, television, and music production.

History
4nologue was founded on 11 May 2007 by Anuwat Wichiennarat. The company initially specialized as an event/concert organizer for international artists performing in Thailand, especially K-pop bands including TVXQ, Big Bang and Got7. It operated at a loss during its first six years but began turning a profit in the seventh, after which it became more successful.

In 2018, the company began branching into talent management and music production, launching the boy group Nine by Nine as a pilot project in association with Nadao Bangkok. After the project concluded in 2019, the company debuted its new boy band Trinity, comprising four of Nine by Nine's members.

Company CEO Anuwat plans to further develop Thai male and female idol groups and introduce them to international markets.

Artists

Nine by Nine

Nine by Nine was a one-year special project launched in November 2018, in association with Nadao Bangkok. The group members starred in two Thai television series In Family We Trust (2018) and Great Men Academy (2019).

Trinity

Trinity is a Thai pop boy band formed in 2019. The group is composed of Sivakorn Adulsuttikul, Lapat Ngamchaweng and Jackrin Kungwankiatichai; former member Teeradon Supapunpinyo departed from the group in August 2021.

References

Mass media companies of Thailand
Companies based in Bangkok
Thai record labels